Breakheart Pass is a 1975 American Western film that stars Charles Bronson, Ben Johnson, Richard Crenna, and Jill Ireland. Based on the 1974 novel of the same title by Scottish author Alistair MacLean (1922–1987), it was filmed in north central Idaho.

Plot
In the 1870s, residents of the garrison at the Fort Humboldt frontier outpost of the United States Army  are reported to be suffering from a diphtheria epidemic. A special express train is heading up into the remote mountain ranges towards the fort filled with reinforcements and medical supplies. There are also civilian passengers on the train in the rear luxurious private car – Nevada Governor Fairchild (Richard Crenna) and his fiancée Marica (Jill Ireland), the daughter of the fort's commander.

The train stops briefly in the small whistle stop settlement of Myrtle, where it takes on board local lawman United States Marshal Pearce (Ben Johnson) and his prisoner, John Deakin (Charles Bronson), a supposedly notorious outlaw who was identified via a picture in a newspaper advertisement offering a $2,000 (approximately $ today) reward. But as the journey goes on through the beautiful snowy mountain scenery, several train passengers, including most of the train's soldier escort, are mysteriously killed or go missing. Deakin, who is actually an undercover U.S. Secret Service agent, uncovers en route that the "epidemic" at the outpost is actually a conspiracy between a group of killers led by the notorious outlaw Levi Calhoun (Robert Tessier), and a tribe of Indians under Chief White Hand (Eddie Little Sky). Instead of medical supplies, the train's boxcars are transporting a large secret shipment of weapons, rifles, ammunition and dynamite stolen from U.S. arms manufacturers for sale to the Indians, in return for allowing Calhoun and his men to mine and smuggle gold from their lands. Most of the people on the train, including Governor Fairchild and Marshal Pearce, are Calhoun's partners in crime, and those innocents who discover the evidence for his sinister plot are eliminated. Eventually, Deakin narrows his list of possible uninvolved allies down to Marica and Army Major Claremont (Ed Lauter), who agrees to assist the agent in his efforts to prevent the arms delivery.

At snow-covered Breakheart Pass, all hell breaks loose as Indians attack the train to take the weapons they were promised, and Calhoun and his men ride out to the train in order to find out what is going on. Deakin and Major Claremont use dynamite to blow up and break the track rails, grounding the train before it reaches the fort; and while Deakin runs interference, Claremont rushes ahead to Fort Humboldt to free the soldiers imprisoned by Calhoun's gang. A gunfight breaks out when the freed soldiers clash with the Indians and bandits at the train; Calhoun is killed by Gov. Fairchild when he threatens Marica, but the governor is then in turn cut down by Major Claremont. At the end of the battle, Deakin intercepts Marshal Pearce and shoots him when the corrupt lawman decides to go down fighting.

Cast

 Charles Bronson as Agent John Deakin / John Murray
 Ben Johnson as U.S. Marshal Pearce
 Richard Crenna as Governor Richard Fairchild
 Jill Ireland as Marica
 Charles Durning as O'Brien
 Ed Lauter as Major Claremont
 Bill McKinney as Reverend Peabody
 David Huddleston as Dr. Molyneux
 Roy Jenson as Chris Banion
 Rayford Barnes as Sergeant Bellew
 Scott Newman as Rafferty
 Robert Tessier as Levi Calhoun (voiced by Paul Frees (uncredited))
 Joe Kapp as Henry, The Steward
Archie Moore as Carlos, The Cook
 Sally Kirkland as Jane–Marie, First Prostitute
 Sally Kemp as Second Prostitute
 Eddie Little Sky as Chief White Hand
 Keith McConnell as Gabriel
 John Mitchum as Red Beard
 Read Morgan as Captain Oakland
 Robert Rothwell as Lieutenant Newell
 Casey Tibbs as Jackson
 Doug Atkins as Jebbo
 Eldon Burke as Ferguson (uncredited)
 Irv Faling as Colonel Scoville (uncredited)
 William Klein as Seamon Devlin (uncredited)
 Ron Ponozzo as Soldier (uncredited)

Production

Writing
Producers Elliott Kastner and Jerry Gershwin had filmed a number of Alistair MacLean novels previously, including Where Eagles Dare and When Eight Bells Toll.

Casting
Charles Bronson was paid $1 million plus 10% of the gross for his role.

Lewiston realtor Irv Falling, a retired U.S. Army colonel, played a cameo role as the father of Marica, Gov. Fairchild's fiancée (Jill Ireland) in the final snowy scene, as frontier army colonel and commander at Fort Humboldt reunites with his daughter. He had helped the Bronsons find a home to rent. Bronson and Ireland arrived in Lewiston for filming in early March 1975 and stayed at 322 Stewart Avenue.

Filming
Some exteriors were filmed in Pierce and Reubens in north central Idaho. The Native American extras were Nez Perce, mostly from 

Railroad scenes were filmed on the Camas Prairie Railroad (based in Lewiston). 
The hire of the train (Great Western Railway steam locomotive #75) carriages and track cost $500,000 (approximately $ today). 
It was the final film role participation for longtime veteran stuntman Yakima Canutt, who was aged 79 at the time. He was in charge of the second unit direction; his son, Joe, was one of the stuntmen. Canutt oversaw the scene where the caboose and troop carriages crashed off the rail line into a ravine. Six cameras filmed the cars falling  into the canyon, however, the dummies (representing the soldiers) failed to fall out during the crash. The crash was filmed at Halfmoon Trestle, east of U.S. Route 95 in Lapwai Canyon.

Alternating shots of clear and overcast skies are present in the final climactic scenes.

Bronson later said that in the original story it was not revealed until the very end that his character was a detective. When he read an early script, the reveal was made much earlier. Bronson demanded it be changed to the way it was in the original story and this was done. During filming, Bronson discovered the script had been changed again to reveal his character was a detective early. Bronson was unhappy with this but went along with it as by then filming was underway and he felt he could not leave the production.

Music
A limited edition (3,000 run) CD soundtrack of Breakheart Pass, highlighting the original music of Jerry Goldsmith, was released by La-La Land Records. It is out of print.

Release

Home media

DVD
 Release date: December 19, 2000
 Full Screen & Widescreen Anamorphic
 Region: 1
 Aspect Ratio: 1.33:1 & 16:9
 Audio tracks: English, French
 Subtitles: English, Spanish
 Running time: 95 minutes

Kino Video released "Breakheart Pass" for the first time on Blu-ray on August 12, 2014.

Reception

Box office
The film was a box office disappointment in the United States.

Critical response
The Los Angeles Times called it "a fun if familiar picture but is played so broadly on such an elementary level that it can hope to satisfy only the most undemanding of viewer."

See also
 List of American films of 1975

References

External links
 
 
 
 Movie review at AlistairMacLean.com

1975 Western (genre) films
1970s adventure drama films
1975 drama films
1975 films
American Western (genre) films
American adventure drama films
Films based on British novels
Films based on Western (genre) novels
Films based on works by Alistair MacLean
Films scored by Jerry Goldsmith
Films set in Nevada
Films set in Utah
Films set in the 1870s
Films set on trains
Films shot in Idaho
United Artists films
United States Marshals Service in fiction
1970s English-language films
1970s American films